Kinga Janurik (born 6 November 1991) is a Hungarian handballer for Ferencváros and the Hungary national team.

Achievements
Nemzeti Bajnokság I:
Winner: 2021
Bronze Medalist: 2013, 2014, 2015, 2016, 2017, 2018
Magyar Kupa:
Finalist: 2016, 2018
EHF Cup:
Semifinalist: 2015

References

1991 births
Living people
Handball players from Budapest
Hungarian female handball players
Handball players at the 2020 Summer Olympics